Feedbin is an open source feed reader. It is a web application which can be self hosted on a web server or used through a paid subscription. It has an Android client based on News+.

References

External links 

 

Free software programmed in Ruby
Cross-platform free software
News aggregators